Nute is a surname. Notable people with the surname include:

 Alonzo Nute (1826–1892), American politician
 Benjamin Nute (1800–1877), American farmer and businessman
 Grace Lee Nute (1895–1990), American historian
 Richard Nute, American engineer